This is a list of the equipment used by the Ghana Army.

Firearms

Vehicles

Artillery

Air Defense

References 

Military equipment of Ghana
Military of Ghana
Ghana